Emotion-sensitive software (ESS) is software specifically designed to target and monitor emotional response in a human being. Some software measures anger by comparing the pitch of a voice to a regular, or calm, pitch. Another approach is the measurement of physical appearance. If a camera or similar recording device picks up a certain amount of red pigmentation in the skin the system can be alerted that this person is angered.

However, many producers of ESS do not reveal the secrets of how the software works. This increases competition between companies and stops people from attempting to avoid the system by masking these tendencies.

One application of ESS was developed by University of Notre Dame Assistant Professor of Psychology Sidney D'Mello, Art Graesser from the University of Memphis and a colleague from Massachusetts Institute of Technology. They used the technology to create an electronic tutor that could assess a student's level of boredom and frustration based on facial expression and body language, and react accordingly.

References

Human–computer interaction
Affective computing